Adhisayappiravigal is a 1982 Indian Tamil-language masala film directed by R. Thyagarajan, starring Prabhu, Karthik and Radha. The film was released on 14 November 1982.

Plot 
Kathamuthu, Nallamuthu, Nachimuthu and Thangamuthu are village idiots, incapable of doing even the most basic things without their mother's guidance. She is unable to find anyone to marry them and, worried about their futures, turns to her brother Pannaiyar. He wants nothing to do with any of them but agrees to hold on to his sister's jewellery. He promises to return the jewellery to the brothers once they have settled in life. Once his sister dies, Pannaiyar decides to keep the jewellery for himself. His daughter Ponni is aware of this and, wanting to teach them responsibility, pushes the brothers to do something with their lives. Despite owning land themselves, the four choose to work for their uncle and while away their time.

Thangamuthu meets Shanthi during an accidental trip to the city and the two fall in love. Although Shanthi's inspector brother is hesitant, he ultimately relents. Thangamuthu and Shanthi marry in secret and it is not until she goes to his home that she realises the extent of her new relatives' naivete. She takes it upon herself to teach them and soon has them farming their own lands. Slowly, they get more wise to the ways of the world. The two oldest brothers marry two sisters, Indramathi and Chandramathi. Nachimuthu and Ponni are in love as well but Pannaiyar opposes this match. Ponni tells the brothers and their wives about the stolen jewellery and comes up with a plan to get it back. Their plans cause them to clash with Pannaiyar and others set on getting the jewellery for themselves.

Cast 
Karthik as Thangamuthu
Radha as Shanthi
Prabhu as Nachimuthu
Rajyalakshmi as Ponni
Y. G. Mahendran as Kathamuthu
S. V. Shekher as Nallamuthu
Vanitha as Indramathi
Arundhati as Chandramathi
Jaishankar as Inspector
Silk Smitha as Rani
Pandari Bai as the village idiots' mother
Thengai Srinivasan as Boothamkodi Pannaiyar
Balan K. Nair as Minor
V.Gopalakrishnan  as Gopinathan
Karate Mani
Thooyavan
Usilaimani

Soundtrack 
The music was composed by Shankar–Ganesh.

Reception 
Kalki appreciated the performances of the actors playing the four village idiots.

References

External links 
 

1980s masala films
1980s Tamil-language films
1982 films
Films directed by R. Thyagarajan (director)
Films scored by Shankar–Ganesh